Amanita eliae is an inedible species of fungi in the family of Amanitaceae found in Europe. It was described by Lucien Quélet in 1872. Synonyms include Amanitaria eliae, Amanita godeyi, and Amanita cordae.

Description
It has a white volva. Its warts correspond to easily removable, deep depressions in the cap of the species. The cap and stem have white flesh. The stem is initially entirely white, but browns with age with a narrow bulb. The stem ring is white. Its stem is smooth and has white gills on the hymenium. Its odour and taste are indistinct.

Habitat
It is commonly found coniferous and deciduous trees. It is found in the autumn and summer.

References

Further reading

Fungi described in 1872
eliae
Poisonous fungi
Taxa named by Lucien Quélet